Óscar Elías Cerén Delgado (born 26 October 1991) is a Salvadoran professional footballer who plays as a midfielder for Primera División club Isidro Metapán.

Cerén's brother Darwin plays for Major League Soccer team Houston Dynamo and his sister Brenda for the El Salvador women's national football team.

Club career
Cerén started his career when he signed with Juventud Independiente. With the team of San Juan Opico he became one of the most important players in the club. He coincided with his brother Darwin on the team, during the same period of time. Cerén helped the team reach the semi-finals of the Clausura 2013, Apertura 2013 and Clausura 2014, but the final was not reached.

However, both left the team in 2014, but Óscar continued playing in the Salvadoran Primera División with Águila. With the team of San Miguel Cerén lost the final of the Apertura 2014 against Isidro Metapán on penalties.

Curiously, Cerén signed with Isidro Metapán in 2015, becoming one of the best players in the team thanks to his speed, goals and assists.

In 2016 he signed with Alianza F.C., team where he obtained his greatest successes winning the Apertura 2017 and Clausura 2018. With Alianza Cerén has shown a great level, even being taken into account by Carlos de los Cobos for matches of the 2019–20 CONCACAF Nations League qualifying. One of his best games with Alianza was a 5–2 victory against Águila, Cerén scored two goals to his former team.

International career
Cerén was a squad member at the 2017 Copa Centroamericana and 2017 CONCACAF Gold Cup. Also has played in the qualifiers to the CONCACAF Nations League.

In November 2018, Óscar had the privilege of playing with his brother Darwin a friendly game with El Salvador against Haiti at the Estadio Cuscatlán.

International goals
Scores and results list El Salvador's goal tally first.

Honours

Player

Club
C.D. Águila
 Primera División
 Runners-up: Apertura 2014

Alianza F.C.
 Primera División
 Champion: Apertura 2017, Clausura 2018
 Runners-up: Apertura 2016, Clausura 2017, Apertura 2018, Clausura 2019

References

External links
 

1991 births
Living people
People from Quezaltepeque
Salvadoran footballers
Association football midfielders
C.D. Juventud Independiente players
C.D. Águila footballers
El Salvador international footballers
2017 Copa Centroamericana players
2017 CONCACAF Gold Cup players
2019 CONCACAF Gold Cup players